Aspinwall may refer to:

People
Aspinwall (surname), including a list of people with the name

Places
 Aspinwall, Iowa, United States
 Aspinwall, Pennsylvania, United States
 Aspinwall Lake (Mahnomen County, Minnesota), a lake in Minnesota
 Alternative/historical name of Colón, Panama

See also
Aspinall (disambiguation)